L is a novel written by the Norwegian writer Erlend Loe. It is about a group of young men who go on an expedition to the small island Manuae in the Pacific Ocean. It was published in 1999, and was a big success.

Plot
The main theme in the story is an expedition to prove main character Erlend's theory about Pacific islands. He believes that their inhabitants came from South America on skates. This is, of course, an impossible theory, but the story is kept alive with Loe's personal, at times naïve, style. 

The book is divided into two parts. The first part is about how Erlend, inspired by Thor Heyerdahl's Kon-Tiki, came up with the theory, and the planning of the expedition. The second part is about the expedition itself, which takes place on Manuae in the Cook Islands. The seven boys in the expedition, including fictionalized versions of Loe and artist Kim Hiorthøy, all feel that they have not contributed to "build Norway", so this trip is like their way of saying "sorry", and placing Norway on the map once and for all. Erlend strongly believes that his theory is correct and that they will be praised as heroes when they return.  In the end of the book the boys feel like this wasn't enough to place Norway on the map, so they start another experiment, where they try out the different ways of governing a country. For example, they try out apartheid and communism. They spend the last days on the island sitting around and waiting for the boat to pick them up. When they come home there is no marching band waiting at the airport, and realise that it will take more to get Norway "out there".

References

1999 Norwegian novels
20th-century Norwegian novels
Books by Erlend Loe
Novels set in Oceania